Génesis Rosangela Reasco Valdez (born 18 July 1998) is an Ecuadorian freestyle wrestler. She won the gold medal in the women's 76kg event at the 2022 South American Games held in Asunción, Paraguay. She won the silver medal in her event at the 2022 Bolivarian Games held in Valledupar, Colombia. She is also a three-time silver medalist at the Pan American Wrestling Championships.

Career 

She competed in the women's 76kg event at the 2019 Pan American Games held in Lima, Peru. In 2020, she competed at the Pan American Wrestling Olympic Qualification Tournament held in Ottawa, Canada without qualifying for the 2020 Summer Olympics in Tokyo, Japan. She also failed to qualify for the Olympics at the World Olympic Qualification Tournament held in Sofia, Bulgaria.

She won the silver medal in the women's 76kg event at the 2021 Pan American Wrestling Championships held in Guatemala City, Guatemala. At the 2021 U23 World Wrestling Championships held in Belgrade, Serbia, she lost her bronze medal match in the women's 76kg event. She also lost her bronze medal match in the women's 76kg event at the 2022 World Wrestling Championships held in Belgrade, Serbia.

She won the gold medal in her event at the 2022 South American Games held in Asunción, Paraguay. She defeated María Acosta of Venezuela in her gold medal match.

Achievements

References

External links 
 

Living people
1998 births
Place of birth missing (living people)
Ecuadorian female sport wrestlers
Pan American Wrestling Championships medalists
Wrestlers at the 2019 Pan American Games
Pan American Games competitors for Ecuador
South American Games gold medalists for Ecuador
South American Games medalists in wrestling
Competitors at the 2022 South American Games
21st-century Ecuadorian women